Charles Piper Smith (1877 – 1955) was an American Botanist.

References

1877 births
1955 deaths
American botanists